Three of a Kind is a 1936 American film directed by Phil Rosen. It was made by Invincible Pictures Corporation which was later absorbed into Republic Pictures.

Plot 

Barbara Penfield (Evalyn Knapp) tries to persuade her father, laundry magnate F. Thorndyke Penfield (Richard Carle), to invest in a business venture proposed by her sweetheart Rodney Randall (Bradley Page). Her father, knowing Randall to be a fortune hunter, refuses and stops her allowance and freezes her bank account. Undeterred from financing Randall, but lacking the cash, Barbara decides to trade in her expensive car for a very cheap one.

While she is out on a test drive with a salesman, her car is fraudulently sold by con man "Con" Cornelius (Berton Churchill) who is loitering around the car yard. The buyer, Jerry Bassett (Chick Chandler), is a Penfield Company laundry worker who has just quit after winning best employee award and $1,000. He sets out for the Royal Valley holiday resort and on the road picks up Barbara who, after the cheap car broke down, is hitchhiking to a rendezvous there with Randall. She does not recognize her own car which Bassett is driving, and introduces herself using the false name Beatrice Payne.

Arriving at the Royal Valley, Bassett and "Beatrice" book into separate rooms. Later Cornelius and his daughter Prudence arrive. Bassett learns that Beatrice is really Barbara Penfield, the daughter of his ex-employer, and it is confirmed when Penfield himself arrives to put a stop to any further negotiation between her and Randall.

Several cases of mistaken identity result between Penfield, Randall, Cornelius, and Bassett, with almost everyone believing the other is rich and manoeuvering to make a deal with him. Meanwhile, police investigator Cogarty is on the trail of the fraudulently sold car and he recognizes ex-convict Cornelius and swindler Randall. Bassett is wrongly arrested for stealing the car, with police compounding the mistaken identity situation.

Prudence and Randall marry, and when all the identities are sorted out, Barbara and Bassett announce their intention to do the same and to manage the Penfield business when Penfield retires.

Cast 
Evalyn Knapp as Barbara Penfield
Chick Chandler as Jerry Bassett
Berton Churchill as 'Con' Cornelius
Richard Carle as F. Thorndyke Penfield
Bradley Page as Rodney Randall
Patricia Farr as Prudence Cornelius
Lew Kelly as Police Sgt. Cogarty
Pat West as Beef Smith
Bryant Washburn as Mr. Grimwood
Harry Bradley as Mr. Fash
John Dilson as Doc Adams
Billy Gilbert as The Tailor

External links 

1936 films
American comedy films
American black-and-white films
Chesterfield Pictures films
Films directed by Phil Rosen
1936 comedy films
1930s English-language films
1930s American films